An information server is an integrated software platform consisting of a set of core functional modules that enables organizations to integrate data from disparate sources and deliver trusted and complete information, at the time it is required and in the format it is needed. Similar to how an application server is a software engine that delivers applications to client computers, an information server delivers consistent information to consuming applications, business processes and portals.

Architecture overview

An information server application can be considered in three logical tiers: a platform foundation, a layer of information oriented services, and a series of optional modules. Viewed in this construct, an information server looks like this:
 
Optional components
Understand – data profiling and metadata creation to understand the content, quality, and structure of information as it resides in source systems
Cleanse – data quality procedures to eliminate duplicate information, match common records, standardize formats and survive the best information forward
Transform – extract, transform and load (ETL) information from any data source (structured, unstructured, mainframe or application) to another
Deliver – data federation capabilities to view and manipulate data from a collection of resources as if they were a single resource while retaining their autonomy and integrity.
Services layer
Parallel processing
Metadata management
Administration and reporting
Service deployment (for SOA utilization)
Connectivity
Platform foundation
Application server
Relational database

When fully leveraged on a single platform, the optional components and shared platform services clearly differentiate an information server from other traditional data integration technologies due to its holistic approach to information integration.

Advantages

Trust 
 An information server can be deployed to continuously validate the consistency, accuracy and quality of information as it flows from data sources and across applications and business processes. Data quality is ensured throughout the information lifecycle.

Productivity
 A unified platform with roll-based user interfaces reduces training costs and learning curves previously required to learn and manage different data integration tools from multiple vendors. Technical teams get up to speed quickly and deliver projects faster.

Collaboration 
 A unified metadata management layer facilitates the alignment of business users and technical teams through a shared understanding of information’s meaning, context, and lineage. Leveraging the metadata shortens the time between specification and build in projects by understanding impact analysis and lineage of data.

Scalability
 Parallel processing technology ensures that enormous volumes of information can be processed very quickly. It further ensures that processing capacity is never an inhibitor to achieving project results, allowing solutions to easily expand to new hardware, and to fully leverage the processing power of all available hardware.

Reuse
 By enabling integration logic to be packaged and deployed as a service, technical teams using a service oriented architecture (SOA) can leverage work done on previous projects to more efficiently build their solutions while ensuring that consistent rules are applied to information integration, improving data governance.

Business value
Most key business initiatives cannot succeed without effective integration of information. In fact, the IBM Global CEO survey (Jan 2006) found that organizations that were highly effective at integrating information were five times more likely to generate value than those who were poor at it.  Critical business initiatives such as single view of a customer, business intelligence, supply chain management, and Basel II and Sarbanes–Oxley (SOX) compliance require consistent, complete, and trustworthy information. An information server helps companies to integrate information in order to deliver business results within these initiatives faster, with higher quality results. 

For business intelligence, it helps organizations develop a unified view of their business for better decisions by enabling them to understand existing data sources to cleanse, correct, and standardize information, and to load analytical views.
For master data management, it helps organizations develop authoritative master data by enabling them to understand where and how information is stored across systems, and to consolidate disparate data into a single, reliable record.
For infrastructure rationalization, it helps organizations reduce operating costs by allowing them to understand relationships between systems, and to define migration rules to consolidate instances or to move data from obsolete systems to new applications and databases.
For business transformation initiatives, it helps organizations speed development and increase business agility by providing reusable information services that can be seamlessly plugged into applications, business processes, and portals. These standards-based services are maintained centrally by information specialists, with a single point of maintenance, but are widely accessible throughout the enterprise.
For risk and compliance projects, it helps organizations improve visibility and data governance by allowing organizations to define and maintain complete, authoritative views of information with proof of lineage and quality. These views can be made widely available and reusable as shared services.

History
The core technologies of an information server are not new. Data integration technologies like extract, transform, and load (ETL), data cleansing and matching (both relational and probabilistic approaches), data profiling, and data federation or replication have been around for many years. Reputable vendors and several discrete but inter-related markets focus on solutions for these differing styles of data integration (ETL, data quality, data replication, data federation, etc.).

As a result of these multiple approaches to data integration and the distinct capabilities of the vendors, organizations’ approach to data integration has been one plagued by a lack of standards and inconsistent utilization of tools, multiple vendor relationships, problematic conflict resolution across tools, and a lack of unifying metadata to link all of the tools and information together. Additionally, the cost to train employees and maintain multiple products can also become cost-prohibitive to organizations.  

However, since 2000-2002 these markets and function-specific vendors have been converging (see Gartner’s “Magic Quadrant for Data Integration Tools 2006”). Vendors have been expanding their offerings to incorporate a broader range of capabilities and the lines between these markets and the once distinct vendors are beginning to blur. Both customer demands for a more holistic approach to data integration and a natural evolution of vendor technology is quickening the convergence in the marketplace to a more unified and integrated tool set that can streamline approaches to data integration. Additionally, the influence of Web services and service-oriented architectures on organizations today is requiring that data integration vendors expand their capabilities around delivering information as a service so it can easily be consumed by business processes, applications, and portals. 

In October 2006, IBM announced the launch of IBM Information Server, the first entry into this new category of data integration tools. It is the first unified software platform able to deliver all of the functions to integrate, enrich and deliver trusted information for key business initiatives. IBM Information Server’s architecture meets all of the criteria that define it as an integrated software platform for information integration, and certainly establishes a functional benchmark for other vendors looking to say they have an information server too.

External links
Information Server IBM em Português
Intelligent Enterprise
SearchDataManagement
Computerwire
CRN Magazine
eWeek

ZDNET

Computing platforms